Paralopostega serpentina is a moth of the family Opostegidae. It was first described by Otto Swezey in 1921. It is endemic to the Hawaiian islands of Oahu and possibly Kauai.

The larvae feed on Melicope species, including Melicope elliptica, Melicope clusiaefolia and Melicope sapotaefolia. They mine the leaves of their host plant. The mine starts along the margin of the leaf. As it enlarges it becomes very serpentine, and finally has quite long back-and-forth loops nearly half-way across the width of the leaf.

External links
Generic Revision of the Opostegidae, with a Synoptic Catalog of the World's Species (Lepidoptera: Nepticuloidea)

Opostegidae
Endemic moths of Hawaii
Biota of Oahu
Moths described in 1921